Bubanza is a commune of Bubanza Province in north-western Burundi. The capital lies at Bubanza city.

Towns and villages
 Bubanza (capital)  Bihembe  Butega  Buvyuko  Cabire  Kabwitika  Karonge  Kuwintaba  Mitakataka  Nyabugoye  Nyarusagare

Communes of Burundi
Bubanza Province

it:Bubanza